KGGF-FM (104.1 FM) is a radio station broadcasting an oldies format. Licensed to Fredonia, Kansas, United States, the station is currently owned by Sek Media, LLC.

History
The station went on the air as KJGM on 1995-11-30.  On 1997-05-23, the station changed its call sign to the current KGGF-FM.

References

External links
KGGF-FM's website (within www.kggfradio.com)

GGF-FM
Radio stations established in 1997
1997 establishments in Kansas